Star Wars: Escape From The Death Star is a board game published in 1990 by West End Games.

Contents
Escape From The Death Star is a game in which Luke Skywalker, Han Solo, Princess Leia and Chewbacca attempt to find their way through the vast Death Star's sectors.

Reception
Richard Ashley reviewed Escape From The Death Star for Games International magazine, and gave it a rating of 4 out of 10, and stated that "On the whole, a good try at converting this subject to a solitaire game, but a waste of time as a competitive multiplayer game."

References

Board games introduced in 1990
West End Games games
Star Wars games